Sabahoon Qaume (born 11 February 1992) is an Afghan international footballer who plays for Danish club Kolding IF, as a right back.

References

1992 births
Living people
Afghan footballers
Afghanistan international footballers
Kolding IF players
Association football fullbacks
Afghan expatriate footballers
Afghan expatriate sportspeople in Denmark
Expatriate men's footballers in Denmark
Sportspeople from Khost